Alfred Hackman (1811–1874) was sub-librarian at the Bodleian Library.

Early life
Hackman was born at Fulham, southwest of London, on 8 April 1811. His father, Thomas Hackman, was the parochial vestry clerk in Fulham, giving him access to the powerful Bishop of London, William Howley. Through Howley's influence, Alfred Hackman matriculated as a servitor of Christ Church, Oxford on 25 Oct. 1832. Hackman was educated in France, and then spent several years as an usher in a boarding-school run by his father. Hackman graduated from university with a Bachelor of Arts degree in 1837 and then received a Master of Arts degree in 1840.

Career
Through the influence of Thomas Gaisford, curator of the Bodleian library, Hackman obtained a temporary post there in 1837, and was connected with the library for more than thirty-five years afterwards. In 1837, Hackman also became chaplain of Christ Church College in Oxford, and curate to the Reverend Henry Gary at St. Paul's Church in Oxford (now a student coffehouse). Hackman was appointed by his college vicar of Cowley, near Oxford, in 1839, and was from 1841 to 1873 a precentor at Christ Church.

From 1844 to 1871 Hackman was vicar of St. Paul's, where he exercised a considerable influence as a preacher, not only on his own parishioners, but also on the undergraduates of the university, who were attracted by his earnestness and quaint vivacity. Hackman attended to his parish, with his free time largely occupied by his duties in the Bodleian Library, where in 1862 he was appointed sub-librarian. Hackman published A Catalogue of the Collection of the Tanner MSS. in the Bodleian, 4to, Oxford, 1860,.

Death
In 1873, Hackman retired from the library and Christ Church due to poor health. He died, unmarried, in his brother's house in the village of Long Ditton, Surrey, on 18 Sept, 1874.  He is buried at St. Sepulchre's Cemetery in Oxford.

References

External links
 The grave of Alfred Hackman in St Sepulchre's Cemetery, Oxford, with biography

1811 births
1874 deaths
People from Fulham
English librarians
People associated with the Bodleian Library
Alumni of Christ Church, Oxford
Burials at St Sepulchre's Cemetery